Roman 'Romy' Louis Gosz (August 2, 1910 Grimms, Wisconsin - August 29, 1966, Manitowoc, Wisconsin) was a popular and commercially successful polka musician in the upper Midwest. Gosz's music featured the Bohemian brass style and appealed to the many ethnic groups (Dutch, Bohemian, Belgian, German and Polish) found throughout the region.

History 
Romy Gosz was born on August 2, 1910 in Grimms, Wisconsin to Paul and Anna Gosz, the fourth of their seven children.

At age 7, Gosz would take his first and only piano lesson. When he told his piano teacher he would not be able to make his next lesson because he had a dance job, he was told "not to come back at all if you can play a job with one lesson".

When he was 11, Gosz joined his father Paul and his older brother's, George and Mike, in forming the Paul Gosz Orchestra. Their first job was playing at a silver wedding anniversary in Newton, Wisconsin. The very next night, they played a golden anniversary at the J.D. Prokash hall in Rockwood, Wisconsin and the night after that, the group played a sixtieth wedding anniversary dance.

A few years later, Gosz's father Paul decided to work more at his day job at the local lime kiln, Allwood Lime Company, and he handed the management of the family orchestra over to George. By 1928, leadership of the group had passed to Romy, who was barely eighteen at the time. Still a minor, Gosz was unable to conduct business and manage the band legally, so he retained his father's name for the group.  Early on, Gosz determined that his group should focus on the making of records and live performances. He thought that playing over the radio on a regular basis would be detrimental to the band's traveling and the resulting opportunity to interact with their audiences.

On July 5, 1929, Gosz married Antoinette Leggio at St. Anne Catholic Church in Francis Creek, Wisconsin, the same parish where he had attended school as a boy. The couple took up residence in a small home that Gosz and his father built in Rockwood. Over the next seven years, the couple would have five children (four sons and one daughter). In 1948, Gosz purchased a home with an adjacent Tavern and Dance Hall at "Polifka's Corners" (the intersection of Manitowoc County Road T and Polifka Road) near Kellnersville.

Gosz and his orchestra cut their first record in 1930 at the Broadway studio in Grafton, Wisconsin. They recorded an old Bohemian tune called . Gosz commented that they did it "just to see what the band sounded like." The recording of "Pilsen Polka" became a bestseller throughout the decade and was key to building Gosz's popularity.

Later that same year, the band donated its services for the diamond jubilee celebration of St. Mary's Catholic church in Tisch Mills, Wisconsin. When the pastor, Father Rudolph James Hodik, went to Rome the following year for an audience with Pope Pius XI, he presented the pontiff with some of Gosz's recordings. Father Hodik returned home with a papal blessing for Gosz and the band. The papal blessing and a picture of Pope Pius were some of Gosz's proudest possessions and were displayed prominently in the Gosz home.

In 1931 Gosz found himself without a trumpet player. Gosz commented, "I knew where I could get a good pianist, but couldn't find a trumpet player, so I changed from piano to trumpet. I taught myself. In six months we made a recording with me double tonguing on the trumpet."

The Wisconsin American Legion was searching for a musical theme for its 1934 convention, when somebody heard Gosz's "The Prune Song". It was immediately adopted as the convention theme. Originally an old Bohemian waltz called "Sveskova Alej", Gosz increased the song's tempo and added some double tonguing to the trumpet part. This is typical of many of his recordings. Today, the song is known as "We Left Our Wives Back Home"

His recordings "Musical Clock" and "Picnic In The Woods" appeared in early country music charts printed by Billboard Magazine.

By 1940, Gosz's band was very popular with the general Wisconsin audiences.  It was around this time that a Sheboygan, Wisconsin radio station polled listeners for their favorite bandleader.  In the one-week poll Gosz placed first, with a margin of seven hundred votes over the second-place finisher, western bandleader, Gene Autry.

The national press soon took note of Gosz's popularity, with articles appearing in Billboard, Coronet, Life, Pic, and Time.

On June 9, 1948, Gosz took part in a battle of the bands at the Milwaukee Arena.  Competing against Louis Bashell, Lawrence Duchow, Harold Loeffelmacher and the Six Fat Dutchmen, Whoopee John Wilfahrt, and Frankie Yankovic.  At the event's conclusion, the title of "America's Polka King" was awarded to Yankovic.

At their peak, Gosz and his bands were on the road six nights a week, returning home for a noon radio show on Sunday and then playing a park concert, picnic, or festival in the afternoon.  The band would perform from 8:00pm to 1:00am, at a pace of up to fourteen songs per hour. At the end of the night, Gosz often played up to five encores. When asked about his schedule, Gosz said, "We're a tough bunch around here.  We have to be. We recently played 52 consecutive nights and not one of my men missed a day on his regular job." Gosz spent the majority of his travels in Wisconsin, playing a circuit of towns that included: Batavia, Bonduel, Denmark, Embarrass, Freedom, Jericho, Kimberly, Krok, Luxemburg, Poland, Pulaski, Royalton, Scandinavia, Slovan, Sobieski, Sugar Bush, Symco, Waterloo, and Zachow.  Less frequently, Gosz played in Michigan, Minnesota, Nebraska and the Dakotas. Gosz handled all of his own bookings, and not being the most attentive businessman, he often double-booked his gigs. Whenever this happened, Gosz would hire a pickup band and play one engagement, and he would send his orchestra to work the other.

Death 
In the latter half of August 1966, Gosz was admitted to Manitowoc Memorial Hospital to undergo gallbladder surgery.  During the operation, surgeons determined that they could not complete the surgery because the gall bladder was too badly infected.  This resulted in further complications, including the onset of pneumonia.  All of this transpired during the week of the Manitowoc County Fair. Gosz's following was so great, it is reported that when his death was announced on August 29 to the fairgoers, the grounds were absolutely silent.  The day of his funeral, over twenty-three hundred people filed by his coffin, paying their respects. Sometime after, a fan commented that, "When he lived, the dance floor was filled with happy people. When he died - standing room only. The church was full." Romy Gosz was buried in the church cemetery of the St. Anne Catholic Church in Francis Creek, Wisconsin.

Recognition 

Inducted into the International Polka Hall of Fame by the International Polka Association in 1979.

Inducted into the Wisconsin Polka Hall of Fame in 1998 with a Life Achievement Award.

Recording Catalog 
Romy recorded over 180 tunes during his lifetime for a variety of labels, including Broadway, Brunswick, Columbia, Coral, Decca, King, Mercury, Mono, Okeh, Polkaland, Universal and Vocalion.

Band Names 
Throughout Romy's career, there were quite a few variations in the name of the band.

 Paul Gosz's Orchestra - Broadway, 1931
 Paulie's Play Boys - Broadway, 1931
 Roman Gosz and His Bohemian Orchestra - Columbia, 1934
 Roman Gosz and His Band - Coral & Decca, 1938–39
 Roman Gosz and His Old Time Band - Coral & Decca, 1938–39
 Roman Gosz and His Orchestra - Okeh & Vocalion, 1934
 Romy Gosz and His Band - Coral & Decca, 1938–39; Mercury & Universal, 1940's; Mono, 1961
 Romy Gosz and His Orchestra - Mercury & Universal, 1940's
 Romy Gosz, His Trumpet, and His Orchestra - Polkaland, 1950's

Song List 

 A 
 A Night in the Spring Waltz
 Adrian Polka
 After the Morning Waltz
 After We Married Waltz
 Alone in the World Waltz
 Amelia Polka
 American Girl Polka
 Antoinette Polka
 Anvil Waltz
 Arise My Darling Polka
 At Home Waltz
 At the Mill Polka
 At the Spring Waltz
 Autumn Rose Laendler

 B 
 
 Barnswallow Polka
 Bay City Polka
 Beautiful Blanche Polka
 Beautiful Evening Waltz
 Belle of The Night Polka, The
 Behind the Blacksmith Shop Waltz
 Blackbird Waltz
 Blue Eyes Waltz
 
 Broadway Polka
 Broke But Happy Polka
 Broken Heart Polka
 By the Lake Waltz

 C 
 Celski Waltz
 Cesky Laendler
 Charming Katie Polka
 Cherry Pickers Polka
 Circling Pigeons Waltz
 Clarinet Polka
 Clarinet Waltz
 Clover by the Water Polka
 Cloverleaf Polka
 Coffee Party Polka
 Costellos Waltz
 Cottage Under the Mountain Waltz
 County Girl Polka
 Crackerjack Polka

 D 
 
 Dancing at the Midway Schottische
 Dandy Polka
 Decca Joe Polka
 Don't Give Up Polka
 Don't Give Up Polka Ver 2
 Dove Polka
 Dove Waltz

 E 
 Echos of Spring Waltz
 Ellen Polka
 Elsa Polka
 Elsie Polka
 Elvira Polka
 Enchanted Woods Waltz
 Evening Breezes Waltz
 Evening on the Lehigh Waltz

 F 
 
 Fall Time Waltz
 Falling Apples Laendler
 Farewell Polka
 Favorite Waltz, The
 Filemena Polka
 Fireman's March
 First Love Waltz
 Forsaken Memories Waltz
 Founding Waltz
 Four Leaf Clover Polka

 G 
 Gaytime Polka
 George & Joe Polka
 Gladiola Waltz
 Go To Sleep My Children Waltz
 Golden Polka
 Good Luck Polka
 Grandfather's Joy Laendler
 Grandmother's Joy Laendler
 Grasshopper Polka
 Green Meadow Waltz

 H 
 Happy Nights Waltz
 Harvest Time Schottische
 Have a Drink Polka
 Heartaches Waltz
 Herr Schmidt
 Hillside Waltz
 Holzauction Schottische
 Home Sweet Home
 Homecoming Waltz
 Hot Stuff Polka
 Huntsman Waltz

 I 
 In Good Humor Leandler
 In the Dark Polka
 In the Green Grove Polka
 Innocence Waltz
 It's Your Fault Polka

 J, K 
 Jo Jo Polka
 Johnny's Tune In Waltz
 Josie Polka
 Jumping Jimmy Polka
 Katinka A Kido Polka
 Kiss Polka

L
 Laendler #1
 Laendler #10
 Laendler #11
 Laendler #13
 Laendler #14
 Laendler #18
 Laendler #30
 
 Let's Get Together Waltz
 Libby's Waltz
 Linky's Laendler
 Lonely Lass Polka
 Loudmouth Polka
 

M
 Madelinka Polka
 Madlenka Polka
 
 Matilda Polka
 Max's Polka
 Meadowbrook Waltz
 Merry Month of May Polka
 
 Mountain Polka
 Musical Clock Polka
 Musicians Come Out and Play Polka
 
 Muziky Muziky Polka
 My Darling Waltz
 My Dreamboat Waltz

O
 Of Olden Days Laendler
 Oh! It was a Beautiful Dream Waltz
 
 Old Accordionist Waltz
 Old Bohemian Laendler
 Old Bohemian Waltz
 Old Lager Polka
 Old Time Laendler
 On Our Porch Polka
 On the Balcony Waltz
 
 Orphan Waltz
 Our Love Waltz

P
 Perlacher Laendler
 Picnic in the Woods Polka (Decca, 1938)
 
 Polka for Two
 
 Prosit Laendler
 Prune Song, The (Columbia, 1933)

 Q, R 
 Quiet Evening Waltz Part 1
 Quiet Evening Waltz Part 2
 Rain Rain Polka
 Randy's Waltz
 
 
 Rib Mountain Polka
 Rolinka Polka
 Rolling Stone Polka
 
 Romy's Laendler
 Romy's Theme Song

 S 
 Saturday Night Waltz
 Sometimes Only Polka
 
 
 
 Sylvia Polka

 T 
 Tea Party Waltz
 Tell Me Sincerely Polka
 Tipsy Waltz
 Tom Cat Polka
 Tribus Polka
 Twenty Crowns Polka

 U, V 
 Under the Bridge Polka
 Unknown Girl Polka
 Vatslov Polka
 Village Barn Schottische
 Village Tavern Polka

 W, X, Y, Z 
 Waltzing in the Woods
 War Eagle March
 Wedding Bells Waltz
 When We Meet Polka
 When We Parted Waltz
 White Acacias Tango
 Who's Going to Love You Polka
 Zeleny Valcik

Former Band Members 
The members of the Gosz bands changed over time as well, with each of the following musicians accompanying Gosz on either a recording session or a live performance.

 Joe Chizek - Tuba
 Richard Fricke - drums
 Andy Heier - drums
 Gene Heier
 Melvin Heier
 Wencil (Jim) Jirikovec - clarinet
 Ludger Karmen
 Gordy Kohlbeck - piano, piano accordion
 Linky Kohlbeck - clarinet, sax
 Dave Kruswick - trumpet
 Don Kruswick - clarinet
 Douglas Morton Lueck - piano 
 Rudy Plocar - trumpet, sax, clarinet
 Fritz Puls - tuba, bass
 Bill Maertz
 Paul Nedvecki
 Norman Skornicka - baritone sax, clarinet
 Joe Stuiber - drums
 Max Terens - bass horn
 Mickey Vetter
 Ray Wanek
 Emil Yindra - saxophone
 Dan Zahorik - piano, accordion

References

External links 
 International Polka Association
 Wisconsin Polka Hall of Fame
 
 Romy Gosz Facebook Page

Polka musicians
1966 deaths
1910 births
Musicians from Wisconsin
20th-century American musicians
People from Cato, Wisconsin